Télépro is a Belgian French language weekly TV listings magazine jointly owned by Roularta and Bayard Presse, as a Société Anonyme under the corporate name "Belgomedia".

References

External links
 Télépro website
1954 establishments in Belgium
French-language magazines